Firuzabad (also Romanized as Fīrūzābād; also known as Firuz Abad Abarghoo and Fīrūzābād Abrqū) is a village in Tirjerd Rural District, in the Central District of Abarkuh County, Yazd Province, Iran. At the 2006 census, its population was 202, in 57 families.

References 

Populated places in Abarkuh County